Łubnice  is a village in Wieruszów County, Łódź Voivodeship, in central Poland. It is the seat of the gmina (administrative district) called Gmina Łubnice.

The village has an approximate population of 1,100.

References

External links
 Łubnice]

Villages in Wieruszów County
Kalisz Governorate
Łódź Voivodeship (1919–1939)